Failure to obey a police officer, failure to obey a police order, or failure to obey a lawful order is a crime in certain jurisdictions.

Canada

In Canada, the Criminal Code makes it illegal for a motor vehicle driver to disobey an order to stop for a police officer.  This includes flight from a peace officer.  Such a charge, other than those involving death or bodily harm, can be prosecuted either summarily or by indictment.  Flight from police causing injury or death is always indictable, with maximum penalties of 14 years and life imprisonment, respectively.  A conviction also comes with a mandatory driver licence suspension by the relevant provincial or territorial Ministry of Transportation (e.g. minimum 5-year suspension of Ontario-wide driving privileges).

United States
In the United States, a failure to obey charge is typically a misdemeanor. For example, in Virginia, it is a misdemeanor to refuse to assist an officer in responding to a breach of the peace or in executing his official duties in a criminal case. In Washington, DC, this law is utilized primarily for purposes of ensuring that officers tasked with directing traffic have the authority to direct motorists and pedestrians in a proper and safe manner.

See also
Civil disobedience
Obstruction of justice
Resisting arrest
Refusing to assist a police officer

References

Crimes